Marsico Nuovo is a town and comune of the province of Potenza in the Basilicata region of southern Italy. It was the seat of the bishops of Grumentum.

It is an agricultural centre in the Agri river valley.

History
The city's origins are obscure, but, after the destruction by the Saracens of the ancient Grumentum, the town grew in importance, and became the seat of a county under the Normans (11th century). Its most famous count was Sylvester of Marsico.

It was subsequently ruled by the Hauteville, the Guarna and Sanseverino families. The last count from the latter, Ferrante Sanseverino, was exiled in 1552 and his fiefs acquired by the Kingdom of Naples.

Main sights 

Among the churches in the town are:
 Cathedral of San Giorgio
 San Gianuario
 San Michele Arcangelo
 Madonna del Carmine
 Santi Maria di Constantinopoli
 San Rocco, contains arts from a destroyed church of All Saints.

References

See also
Marsicovetere
Roman Catholic Diocese of Marsico Nuovo

Cities and towns in Basilicata